Carlos Gutiérrez Estefa (born 5 February 1999) is a Mexican professional footballer who plays as a midfielder for Liga MX club UNAM.

International career
In April 2019, Gutiérrez was included in the 21-player squad to represent Mexico at the U-20 World Cup in Poland.

Career statistics

Club

References

1999 births
Living people
Mexican footballers
Mexico under-20 international footballers
Association football midfielders
Club Universidad Nacional footballers
Atlético San Luis footballers
Liga MX players
Liga Premier de México players
Tercera División de México players
Footballers from Mexico City